Emre Kınay (born 5 March 1970) is a Turkish actor.

Career 
The actor is playing in various films and TV series who playing in communities like Dostlar Theater and Bakırköy Municipal Theaters. He is presently staging plays in the community of Duru Theater where he is founder. 

He made a name with the character who is a landlord, Erkan, playing in the hit crime series of Yılan Hikayesi. He played in hit series "Yeditepe İstanbul" and "Berivan" with Sibel Can.

He was largely well-known with the series of İki Aile, in playing a father character who has three girl and sharing the starring role with İclal Aydın. He played in summer series "Dürüye'nin Güğümleri" with Kaan Urgancıoğlu. He played in period series "Ustura Kemal" based comic book. 

He played a character who is a basketball coach, Cihan, in the series of Güneşi Beklerken, and then a lawyer who returns to high school after years later. He played Haluk character in the series of Güneşin Kızları ending in 2016. He is now playing as Halil character in the series of Dark Story.

Awards
 20th Awards of Afife Theater: "The Most Prosperous Actor of the Year" – Kara Sohbet-2006
 23rd International Istanbul Film Festival: "The Best Actor" Inşaat-2004

Theater
As actor
 1000 Nihayet Bitti: Peter Turrini – Duru Tiyatro – 2016
 Sondan Sonra : Dennis Kelly – Duru Tiyatro – 2010
 Ask Her Yerde : Simon Williams – Duru Tiyatro – 2008
 Bir Mutfak Masali : Kerstin Specht – Bakirköy Belediye Tiyatrolari – 2007
 Kara Sohbet : Amélie Nothomb – Duru Tiyatro – 2006
 Sinir : Muzaffer Izgi – Bakirköy Belediye Tiyatrolari – 2005
 Lütfen Kizimla Evlenir misiniz : Muzaffer Izgi – Bakirköy Belediye Tiyatrolari – 2005
 Ikinci Caddeninin Mahkumu : Neil Simon – Bakirköy Belediye Tiyatrolari – 2002
 Rumuz Goncagül : Oktay Arayici – Bakirköy Belediye Tiyatrolari – 1999
 Bir Cinayet Söylencesi : Melih Cevdet Anday – Bakirköy Belediye Tiyatrolari – 1999
 Kuzguncuklu Fazilet : Yilmaz Karakoyunlu – Bakirköy Belediye Tiyatrolari 
 Bozuk Düzen : Dinçer Sümer – Bakirköy Belediye Tiyatrolari – 1998
 Simyaci : Paulo Coelho – Dostlar Tiyatrosu – 1997
 Baris : Aristopfanes : Bakirköy Belediye Tiyatrolari – 1993
 Sofokles'in Antigone'si : Bertolt Brecht – Bakirköy Belediye Tiyatrolari
 Firtina : William Shakespeare – Istanbul Devlet Tiyatrosu – 1991
 Yuzlesme : [Graham Farrow[] - [Duru Tiyatro Istanbul 2018/19

As director
 Nafile Dünya  : Oktay Arayici – Duru Tiyatro – 2012
 Tatli Çarsamba  : Muriel Resnik – Duru Tiyatro – 2011
 Sondan Sonra  : Dennis Kelly – Duru Tiyatro – 2010
 Ask Her Yerde : Simon Williams – Duru Tiyatro – 2008
 Bir Mutfak Masali : Kerstin Specht – Bakirköy Belediye Tiyatrolari – 2007
 Ikinci Caddenin Mahkumu : Neil Simon – Bakirköy Belediye Tiyatrolari – 2002

Filmography

References

External links
 In IMDb Emre Kınay
 In Sinema Türk Emre Kınay

1970 births
Living people
Turkish male film actors
Turkish male stage actors
Turkish male television actors